The Police Act 1964 (1964 c.48) was an Act of the Parliament of the United Kingdom that updated the legislation governing police forces in England and Wales, constituted new police authorities, gave the Home Secretary new powers to supervise local constabularies, and allowed for the amalgamation of existing forces into more efficient units.

Royal Commission
A Royal Commission on the Police had been appointed in 1960 under the chairmanship of Henry Willink to "review the constitutional position of the police throughout Great Britain".

The appointment of the commission followed two high-profile scandals involving borough police forces. These exposed problems in the relationship between the chief constable and watch committee of each borough, and disputes between central and local government over the control of local forces. In 1958, following a trial into police corruption in Brighton, the presiding judge stated that the judiciary could have no faith in police evidence until the chief constable had been replaced. Brighton Watch Committee complained that they could not properly supervise the force, as they had no access to the annual report of Her Majesty's Inspectorate of Constabulary, which was sent to the Home Secretary. In 1959, the watch committee of Nottingham suspended the city's chief constable, Athelstan Popkess, when he refused to furnish a report on his investigations into alleged corruption of councillors. Details of the investigation were however leaked to the press on the eve of municipal elections. The committee were subsequently forced to reinstate Popkess when the Home Secretary, Rab Butler, threatened to withdraw central government funding.
 
Among the particular subjects for investigation by the commission were: 
The constitution and functions of police authorities
The accountability of police officers including chief constables
The relationship of the police to the public and procedures for dealing with complaints
The remuneration of police constables

The commission published its final report on 31 May 1962. This recommended an urgent review on the number and size of police areas. Among its recommendations were:
No single national force was to be formed, but central government should exercise more powers over local forces
Retention of small police forces of between 200 and 350 officers "justifiable only by special circumstances such as the distribution of the population and the geography of the area"
The optimum size for a police force was more than 500 members, with the police area having a population of at least 250,000
There was "a case" for single police forces for major conurbations
A large reduction in the number of forces in Scotland was needed, to between 20 and 33

The commission noted that of 158 police forces in Great Britain, 97 had an establishment of less than 350.

The Act
The Act received royal assent on 10 June 1964. Among its provisions were:

England and Wales, outside London, was to consist of "police areas". These were to be administrative counties, county boroughs or "combined police areas", consisting of combinations of counties and county boroughs.
The Home Secretary had the power to force compulsory amalgamation schemes from 1 July 1964.
New "police authorities" were to be established: these were to be known as watch committees (in boroughs), police committees (in counties – replacing joint standing committees) or combined police authorities. 
Police authorities were to consist of two-thirds elected members and one-third magistrates. Previously all members of watch committees had been councillors or aldermen, while county joint standing committees were fifty percent county councillors and aldermen, fifty percent magistrates. 
The police authorities had fewer powers than their predecessors, especially the boroughs, with the Home Secretary taking on more supervision than before. The authority were required to maintain an efficient police force, but had no operational role.
Chief constables were given the power to appoint, direct and control special constables.
The chief constable could appoint police cadets with the permission of the authority.
The chief constable was required to make an annual report to the police authority.
A police authority could also request other reports on policing in the police area.
Police authorities were empowered to choose chief constables, deputy and assistant chief constables from a Home Office shortlist. They could also require the chief constable to retire, subject to the Home Secretary's approval.
The Home Secretary could order a complaint against a police force to be investigated by officers of another force.

Amalgamations
On 10 July 1964, the Home Secretary, Henry Brooke, announced he would be using his powers under the Act to amalgamate the county borough forces of Luton and Northampton with the county forces of Bedfordshire and Northamptonshire respectively.

Luton's force had only been formed on 1 April, when it became a county borough, but Mr Brooke said he did not regard the continuance of its existence as in the best interests of policing efficiency. The amalgamations were vigorously, but unsuccessfully, opposed by the boroughs: Luton's campaign went as far as serving a High Court writ on the Home Secretary in an attempt to stop the merger.

In the meantime, the first amalgamation under the Act took place on 1 April 1965 as the result of local government reorganisation, with the formation of the Mid Anglia Constabulary.

Following a change in government at the general election, Frank Soskice became Home Secretary. In 1965 he announced that Exeter City's force would be merged with that of Devon. In addition to the Bedfordshire/Luton, Devon/Exeter, and Northamptonshire/Northampton mergers, 1966 saw the establishment of a new West Midlands Constabulary covering the county boroughs of Dudley, Walsall, Warley, West Bromwich and Wolverhampton, which had been constituted or enlarged by local government reorganisation.

1966 amalgamation scheme
On 16 May 1966, the new Home Secretary, Roy Jenkins announced that the number of police forces in England and Wales was to be reduced from 117 to 49. Where the local authorities concerned did not agree a voluntary scheme he would make a compulsory amalgamation.

Proposed amalgamations
Lancashire County Constabulary to merge with borough police forces of Barrow-in-Furness, Blackburn, Blackpool, Bolton, Burnley, Oldham, Rochdale, St Helens, Southport, Warrington and Wigan
Borough forces of Manchester, Salford and Stockport to merge
Bootle Borough Police and Liverpool City Police
Cheshire† County Constabulary to merge with Wallasey and Birkenhead Borough Police
Cumberland and Westmorland Constabulary † to merge with Carlisle City Police
Durham County Constabulary to merge with Sunderland Borough Police
The police of the new county borough of Teesside to merge with the Yorkshire North Riding Constabulary
Sheffield City Police and Rotherham Borough Police to merge
Amalgamation of Yorkshire West Riding Constabulary with borough police forces of Barnsley, Bradford, Dewsbury, Doncaster, Halifax, Huddersfield and Wakefield
Yorkshire East Riding Constabulary to merge with city police of Kingston upon Hull and York
Worcestershire, Herefordshire and Shropshire County Constabularies to merge with Worcester City Police
Leicestershire & Rutland Constabulary† to merge with Leicester City Police
Staffordshire County Constabulary and Stoke-on-Trent City Police
Derbyshire County Constabulary and Derby Borough Police
Warwickshire County Constabulary and Coventry City Police
Lincolnshire† Constabulary, with Lincoln City Police and Grimsby Borough Police
Nottinghamshire County Constabulary and Nottingham City Police
Norfolk County Constabulary, Norwich City Police and Great Yarmouth Borough Police
East Suffolk Constabulary, West Suffolk Constabulary and Ipswich Borough Police
East Sussex Constabulary, West Sussex constabulary and the borough forces of Brighton, Eastbourne and Hastings
Essex Constabulary and Southend-on-Sea Borough Police
Berkshire, Buckinghamshire and Oxfordshire Constabularies with Oxford City Police and Reading Borough Police
Somerset County Constabulary and Bath City Police (voluntary scheme agreed)
Bournemouth Borough Police and Dorset Constabulary
Portsmouth City Police, Southampton City Police and Hampshire & Isle of Wight Constabulary †
Cornwall Constabulary, Devon & Exeter Police† and Plymouth City Police
Denbighshire, Flintshire and Gwynedd† Constabularies
Glamorgan Constabularies with Merthyr Tydfil, Cardiff and Swansea borough forces
Pembrokeshire, Cardiganshire & Carmarthenshire† and Mid Wales† Constabularies
Monmouthshire Constabulary and Newport Borough Police
It was also envisaged that the forces of Gateshead, Newcastle upon Tyne, South Shields and Tynemouth would be combined into a single Tyneside force if the recommendations of the Local Government Commission for England were carried into effect. 
† Existing combined force

Amalgamations carried out
The amalgamations carried out under the Act differed slightly from the original scheme announced in 1966. In Yorkshire, The North and East Riding constabularies were combined with York City Police, while the borough forces of Hull and Teesside were allowed to continue unmerged. Stockport Borough Police were amalgamated with the Cheshire Constabulary instead of with Manchester and Salford, and the scheme for a Tyneside force was dropped when the Local Government Commission's recommendations were not carried out. Instead Northumberland Constabulary was merged with the two county boroughs north of the Tyne, and Durham Constabulary absorbed those on south Tyneside.

‡ New county borough

Police areas unaffected by amalgamations
The following territorial police forces were not subject to amalgamations under the 1964 Act:
In Greater London: The Metropolitan Police, City of London Police
County constabularies: Hertfordshire, Surrey, Wiltshire
Combined constabularies: Gloucestershire, Kent 
Borough/City forces: Birmingham, Bradford, Bristol, Kingston-upon-Hull, Leeds

Later changes
Several of the amalgamated forces formed under the 1964 Act had short existences, as a wholesale reorganisation of local government in England and Wales outside London was carried out in 1974 under the Local Government Act 1972. Police areas were realigned to correspond to one or more of the non-metropolitan or metropolitan counties created by the 1972 legislation. The sections on the composition of police authorities were repealed by the Police and Magistrates' Courts Act 1994, and new authorities constituted.

Footnotes

References

United Kingdom Acts of Parliament 1964
Acts of the Parliament of the United Kingdom concerning England and Wales
Law enforcement in England and Wales
Police legislation in the United Kingdom